R-26 regional road is a Montenegrin roadway.

History

In November 2019, the Government of Montenegro published bylaw on categorisation of state roads. With new categorisation, R-25 regional road was created from municipal road.

Major intersections

References

R-26